John Leante (fl. 1383) was an English Member of Parliament.

He was related to the MP for Shaftesbury in 1386, Edward Leante.

He was a Member (MP) of the Parliament of England for Shaftesbury in 1383.

References

14th-century births
Year of death missing
English MPs February 1383
People from Shaftesbury